Corin Liall Douieb (born 8 May 1985), known by the stage name The Last Skeptik, is a British rapper and music producer from Finsbury Park, London.

Career
Douieb has worked with artists such as Giggs, Kojey Radical, Mikill Pane, Lunar C, Sway, and MF Grimm, Trim, and Scrufizzer.

His own independent label, Thanks for Trying Records, was established after Douieb left Barely Breaking Even (BBE), the first label he had signed with, in 2014. His 2017 joint EP with rapper Dream Mclean featured the single "Doing Bits".

His sophomore solo album This Is Where It Gets Good, was released in 2017 on his own label, Thanks for Trying Records, featured Kojey Radical, Trim, Takura, and Matt Wills, was released in 2017 on Thanks for Trying Records. His first album as a rapper - See You in The Next Life is a detailed journey about the breakdown of a relationship.

In 2019, Douieb composed the original score to the Royal Court Theatre play titled Superhoe, and made music that merged "street roughness with soulful polish", providing "buzzy highlights". In 2020, Douieb composed the original score to the Amazon Audible Original Audio Play entitled My Mum's A Twat performed by Susie Wokoma. In 2021, Douieb composed the original music for the theatre play Redemption at The Big House Theatre

Douieb hosts the Thanks for Trying Podcast, each episode inviting people from the world of entertainment to join him in drunk conversation, and has had notable guests such as Taika Waititi, Katherine Ryan, Ed Skrein, Kurupt FM, Romesh Ranganathan, Maverick Sabre, Example, Sara Pascoe and Rizzle Kicks.

The Last Skeptik's music has been used on adverts for Rihanna's Instagram, Fenty (fashion house), Mercedes, Adidas, Puma, Powerade and Reebok, and on the BBC's coverage of the 2012 Olympics, as well as Vice'''s documentary on Atlanta Stripclubs, and the BAFTA nominated short film Island Queen.

Discography
AlbumsThanks for Trying (2013)This is Where It Gets Good (2017)Under The Patio (2018)See You In The Next Life (2019)you don't like me but i'm still here (2021)

EPs and collaborationsBroken Window (2007) with Verb THow Not to Make a Living (2012, with Rewd Adams) A.F.Q.B – Kate Upton Ruined My Life (2014, with Illaman)I Don't Even Like You (2014)Revenge is The Best Success (2015)Drumroll Please Single (2017, with Dream Mclean, Jordan Stephens, Mikill Pane and ScrufizzerCheese on Brown Bread (2017, with Dream Mclean)Nice While It Lasted E.P (2020)

Production creditsShampain (The Last Skeptik Remix) (2010) Marina & The DiamondsAll Of This Is Yours (Feat. Baaba Maal) (2010) Get Cape. Wear Cape. FlyAll Falls Down (2010) Get Cape. Wear Cape. FlyDrug Flow (2012) S.A.SPoison (The Last Skeptik Remix) (2013) JehstLove Affair (2015) Scrufizzer x Haile WSTRNStory of Jin (2015) Scrufizzer Them or Me (2016) Trim & Nico Lindsay E.PLet MC It (2016) Mikill Pane E.PSwitch (2019) Shay DAll Quiet on The Eastern Front (2020) Mikill Pane featuring Dream McleanBroken Britain (2021) AwateAnother Episode'' (2021) Piers James

Tours
"Girl Power North America Tour" (2014, supporting Charli XCX)
"Coachella" (2014)
"The Last Skeptik India Tour" (2017)
"Doc Brown UK Tour" (2017)

References

External links
 
 

Living people
People from Finsbury Park
Rappers from London
British DJs
People from Hackney Central
British hip hop record producers
Year of birth missing (living people)